William A. Crawford (January 28, 1936 – September 25, 2015) was a Democratic member of the Indiana House of Representatives, representing the 98th District from 1972 to 2012.  He was also the plaintiff in the 2008 Supreme Court case Crawford v. Marion County Election Board.

References

External links
Project Vote Smart - Representative William A. 'Bill' Crawford (IN) profile
Follow the Money - Bill Crawford
2006 2004 2002 2000 1998 1996 1994 campaign contributions

Democratic Party members of the Indiana House of Representatives
1936 births
2015 deaths
Businesspeople from Indiana
Politicians from Indianapolis
20th-century American businesspeople